Osmanköy can refer to the following villages in Turkey:

 Osmanköy, Çivril
 Osmanköy, İhsaniye
 Osmanköy, İvrindi
 Osmanköy, Nallıhan